Shahdara Mannan shilpi is a politician of Bogra District of Bangladesh and member of parliament for Bogra-1 constituency in 2020 by-election.

Birth and early life 
Shilpi was born in Bogra district. She is the wife of Abdul Mannan, a former MP from Bogra-1 constituency.

Career 
Shahdara Mannan Shilpi is the president of Sariakandi Upazila Awami League. After the death of Abdul Mannan, Member of Parliament for Bogra-1 constituency on 18 January 2020, Shahadara Mannan was elected as a member of parliament for the vacant seat of Bogra-1 constituency on the nomination of Awami League on 14 July 2020.

References 

Living people
Year of birth missing (living people)
People from Bogra District
Bangladesh Nationalist Party politicians
11th Jatiya Sangsad members